The 1949 Lehigh Engineers football team was an American football team that represented Lehigh University as an independent during the 1949 college football season. Lehigh finished last in the Middle Three Conference.

In their fourth year under head coach William Leckonby, the Engineers compiled a 6–3 record, 0–2 against conference opponents. Bob Numbers was the team captain.

Lehigh played its home games at Taylor Stadium on the university's main campus in Bethlehem, Pennsylvania.

Schedule

References

Lehigh
Lehigh Mountain Hawks football seasons
Lehigh Engineers football